Chris Daukaus (born September 25, 1989) is an American mixed martial artist and former police officer who competes in the Heavyweight division of the Ultimate Fighting Championship. He is the older brother of former UFC fighter Kyle Daukaus.  As of February 7, 2023, he is #12 in the UFC heavyweight rankings.

Background
Daukaus was raised in Northeast Philly in the Tacony neighborhood. In 2007, Chris graduated from North Catholic High School, and became a resident of Parkwood, Philadelphia. After graduating, he attended Pennsylvania State University before dropping out. He started training in mixed martial arts a year prior to enrolling into the police academy in order to fill the void of sports and competition after high school, and to follow in the footsteps of his father who was also a police officer.

Mixed martial arts career

Early career

A professional since October 2013 and representing Martinez BJJ, Daukaus compiled an 8–3 record in 11 career bouts as a professional, winning by six knockouts and one decision. Daukaus has competed with CES MMA, Cage Fury Fighting Championships, and Ring Of Combat. He has finished six of his seven professional victories. In his MMA debut at XFE Cage Wars 27, he defeated Robert Duvalle via TKO in the first round. Daukaus also defeated Jeffrey Blachly via TKO in round two in his debut appearance with Cage Fury Fighting Championships at CFFC 50. He defeated Blachly a second time via a unanimous decision at CFFC 62. Then at KOTC Regulator, Daukaus defeated Anthony Coleman via TKO in the first round. He also defeated Plinio Cruz via TKO in round one at CFFC 69. For his lone outing with CES MMA at CES MMA 52 Daukaus defeated Joshua Marsh via TKO in the second round.

At Ring Of Combat 65, he faced Edwin Smart and defeated him via technical knockout in round one to earn the sixth knockout victory of his professional career.

Daukaus suffered a loss to Zu Anyanwu in a bout for the Cage Fury FC Heavyweight Championship at CFFC 73 on March 2, 2019. Daukaus was clearly winning that fight before a big shot changed the complexion of it quickly and Daukaus was knocked out.

He then faced Danny Holmes at CFFC 77 on August 16, 2019. He won the fight via first-round technical knockout.

Daukaus was then scheduled to face Shawn Teed for the Cage Fury FC Heavyweight Championship in a rematch at CFFC 82 on March 21, 2020. However, the whole event was postponed due to the COVID-19 pandemic. The event and the championship bout was rescheduled to take place at August 12, 2020. However, Daukaus signed with the UFC in early August and was replaced by Carl Seumanutafa.

Ultimate Fighting Championship
Daukaus made his UFC debut on nine days notice against Parker Porter on August 15, 2020, at UFC 252. He won the fight via TKO in the first round after a series of punches and a knee dropped Porter.

Daukaus faced Rodrigo Nascimento on October 11, 2020, at UFC Fight Night: Moraes vs. Sandhagen. He won the fight via knockout in round one. This win earned him the Performance of the Night award.

Daukaus faced Aleksei Oleinik on February 20, 2021, at UFC Fight Night: Blaydes vs. Lewis. He won the fight via TKO in round one. This win earned him the Performance of the Night award.

Daukaus was scheduled to face Shamil Abdurakhimov at UFC on ESPN: Sandhagen vs. Dillashaw, but the matchup would be postponed due to COVID-19 protocols within Abdurakhimov's camp. The bout was rescheduled to take place at UFC on ESPN: Hall vs. Strickland on July 31, 2021. However, the bout was postponed for unknown reasons to UFC 266. Daukaus won the fight via technical knockout in round two. This win earned him the Performance of the Night award.

Daukaus faced Derrick Lewis on December 18, 2021, at UFC Fight Night: Lewis vs. Daukaus. He lost the fight via knockout in the first round.

Daukaus faced Curtis Blaydes on March 26, 2022, at UFC on ESPN 33. He lost the fight via TKO early in the second round.

Daukaus was scheduled to face Jairzinho Rozenstruik on October 1, 2022, at UFC Fight Night 211. However, for unknown reasons, the bout was moved to UFC 282 on December 10, 2022. Daukaus lost the fight via technical knockout.

Personal life

Daukaus had been a Philadelphia Police Department officer since 2010. However, on December 1, 2021, in the lead up to his fight with Derrick Lewis, Daukaus decided to quit his position in the police force in order to fully concentrate on his MMA career.

He and his wife Kelly have a son, Cooper.

Championships and achievements
Ultimate Fighting Championship
Performance of the Night (Three times)

Mixed martial arts record

|- 
|Loss
|align=center|12–6
|Jairzinho Rozenstruik
|TKO (punches)
|UFC 282
|
|align=center|1
|align=center|0:23
|Las Vegas, Nevada, United States
|
|-
|Loss
|align=center|12–5
|Curtis Blaydes
|TKO (punches)
|UFC on ESPN: Blaydes vs. Daukaus
|
|align=center|2
|align=center|0:17
|Columbus, Ohio, United States
|
|-
|Loss
|align=center|12–4
|Derrick Lewis
|KO (punches)
|UFC Fight Night: Lewis vs. Daukaus
|
|align=center|1
|align=center|3:36
|Las Vegas, Nevada, United States
|
|-
|Win
|align=center| 12–3
|Shamil Abdurakhimov
|TKO (punches and elbows)
|UFC 266
|
|align=center|2
|align=center|1:23
|Las Vegas, Nevada, United States
|
|-
|Win
|align=center|11–3
|Aleksei Oleinik
|TKO (punches)
|UFC Fight Night: Blaydes vs. Lewis
|
|align=center|1
|align=center|1:55
|Las Vegas, Nevada, United States
|
|-
|Win
|align=center|10–3
|Rodrigo Nascimento
|KO (punches)
|UFC Fight Night: Moraes vs. Sandhagen
|
|align=center|1
|align=center|0:45
|Abu Dhabi, United Arab Emirates
|
|-
|Win
|align=center|9–3
|Parker Porter
|TKO (punches and knee)
|UFC 252
|
|align=center|1
|align=center|4:28
|Las Vegas, Nevada, United States
|
|-
| Win
| align=center|8–3
| Danny Holmes
| TKO (head kick)
| Cage Fury FC 77
| 
| align=center|1
| align=center|1:30
| Atlantic City, New Jersey, United States
|
|-
| Loss
| align=center|7–3
| Azunna Anyanwu
| TKO (punches)
|Cage Fury FC 73
| 
| align=center|2
| align=center|4:05
| Philadelphia, Pennsylvania, United States
|
|-
| Win
| align=center|7–2
| Edwin Smart
| TKO (punches)
| Ring of Combat 65
| 
| align=center|1
| align=center|3:49
| Atlantic City, New Jersey, United States
|
|-
| Win
| align=center|6–2
|Jahsua Marsh
|TKO (punches)
| CES MMA 52
| 
| align=center|2
| align=center|2:16
| Philadelphia, Pennsylvania, United States
|
|-
| Win
| align=center| 5–2
| Plinio Cruz
| KO (punch)
| Cage Fury FC 69
| 
| align=center|1
| align=center|2:38
| Atlantic City, New Jersey, United States
| 
|-
| Win
| align=center| 4–2
| Anthony Coleman
|TKO (punches)
| KOTC: Regulator
|
|align=Center|1
|align=center|3:04
|Stroudsburg, Pennsylvania, United States
| 
|-
| Win
| align=center| 3–2
| Jeffrey Blachly
| Decision (unanimous)
| Cage Fury FC 62
| 
| align=center| 3
| align=center| 5:00
| Philadelphia, Pennsylvania, United States
| 
|-
| Loss
| align=center| 2–2
| Shawn Teed
| Submission (keylock)
| Cage Fury FC 53
| 
| align=center| 2
| align=center| 1:20
| Philadelphia, Pennsylvania, United States
| 
|-
| Win
| align=center| 2–1
| Jeffrey Blachly
| TKO (shoulder injury)
| Cage Fury FC 50
| 
| align=center| 2
| align=center| 0:50
| Atlantic City, New Jersey, United States
| 
|-
| Loss
| align=center| 1–1
| Yordany Hernandez Figueroa
| KO (punches)
| XFE 42
| 
| align=center| 1
| align=center|2:24
| Chester, Pennsylvania, United States
|
|-
| Win
| align=center| 1–0
| Robert Duvalle
| TKO
| XFE 27
| 
| align=center| 1
| align=center| 2:03
| Chester, Pennsylvania, United States
|

See also 
 List of current UFC fighters
 List of male mixed martial artists

References

External links
 
 

1989 births
Living people
American male mixed martial artists
Heavyweight mixed martial artists
Mixed martial artists utilizing Brazilian jiu-jitsu
Ultimate Fighting Championship male fighters
Sportspeople from Philadelphia
Mixed martial artists from Pennsylvania
American practitioners of Brazilian jiu-jitsu
People awarded a black belt in Brazilian jiu-jitsu
Philadelphia Police Department officers